My Girl may refer to:

Music
 "My Girl" (The Temptations song), 1964; recorded by many artists
 "My Girl" (Amine song), 2006
 "My Girl" (Arashi song), 2009
 "My Girl" (Donnie Iris song), 1982
 "My Girl" (Dylan Scott song), 2016
 "My Girl" (The Fooo Conspiracy song), 2016
 "My Girl" (Hoodoo Gurus song), 1983
 "My Girl" (Madness song), 1979
 "My Girl" (folk song) or "In the Pines", a traditional American folk song
 "My Girl (Gone, Gone, Gone)", a song by Chilliwack, 1981
 My Girl (EP), by Kim Hyung-jun, 2011
 "My Girl", a song by Aerosmith from Pump
 "My Girl", a song by Agua de Annique from Air
 "My Girl", a song by Alma from Have U Seen Her?
 "My Girl", a song by Dayglo Abortions from Feed Us a Fetus
 "My Girl", a song by Frank Sinatra
 "My Girl", a song by Honorebel
 "My Girl", a song by Mindless Behavior from #1 Girl
 "My Girl", a song by Young Dro from Best Thang Smokin'

Film and television
 My Girl (film), a 1991 film starring Anna Chlumsky and Macaulay Culkin
 Fan Chan (English: My Girl), a 2003 Thai romantic comedy film
 My Girl (2005 TV series), a South Korean drama series
 My Girl (2008 TV series), a Philippine remake of the South Korean series
 My Girl (2020 TV series), a China streaming television series 
 "My Girl" (Superman: The Animated Series), a television episode

See also
 My Girls (disambiguation)